Amna or Aamna is an Arabic feminine given name that means mean safe, caring, and honest. It is a variant transliteration of Amina. It may refer to:
Aminah, mother of the Islamic prophet Muhammad
Amna Al Haddad, Emirati weightlifter
Amna Al Qubaisi, Emirati female racing driver
Amna bint Abdulaziz bin Jassim Al Thani, Qatari businesswoman
Amna Buttar, Pakistani American physician and politician
Amna Elsadik Badri, Sudanese academic, writer, and activist for women's rights
Amna Lihović, Bosnian footballer
Amna Nawaz, American broadcast journalist

Amna Suleiman, Palestinian cyclist and instructor
Amna Guellali, Libyan-Tunisian human rights activist
Amna Tasneem, Indian bureaucrat from the Indian Administrative Service, (IAS)
Aamna Sardar, Pakistani politician
Amna Nurhusein, Eritrean politician
Amna Riaz, Pakistani YouTuber
Amna Mawaz Khan,  Pakistani classical dancer of Bharatnatyam
Aamna Malick, Pakistani actress
Aamna Sharif, Indian actress
Amna Ilyas, Pakistani film and television actress, and model
Amna Babar, Pakistani supermodel

See also 

 Amina (given name)
 Amina (disambiguation)